The Court-Martial of George Armstrong Custer is a 1977 American telemovie produced by Norman Rosemont.

It was based on a book by Douglas Jones.

The Los Angeles Times called it "marvellous drama".

Cast
James Olson as George Armstrong Custer
Ken Howard as Major Gandiner
Brian Keith as Allan Jacobson
Blythe Danner as Elisabeth Custer
Stephen Elliott as Major General Schofield
Richard Dysart as President Grant
Nicolas Coster as General Sheridan
William Daniels as Major Reno

References

External links
Court Martial of George Armstrong Custer at IMDb
Court Martial of George Armstrong Custer at TCMDB

1977 television films
1977 films
Cultural depictions of George Armstrong Custer
Cultural depictions of Ulysses S. Grant
Films based on books
Films directed by Glenn Jordan
Films scored by Jack Elliott
Military courtroom films
NBC network original films